Khamoshi may refer to:

 Khamoshi (2019 film)
 Khamoshi: The Musical (1996 film)
 Khamoshi (1970 film)
 Khamoshi (TV series)